A special election to the Confederate States House of Representatives for Florida's 1st congressional district was held February 2, 1863.

The winning candidate would serve the remainder of a two-year term in the Confederate States House of Representatives to represent Florida in the 1st Confederate Congress from February 3, 1863, to February 18, 1864.

Background 
In the 1861 congressional election, James Baird Dawkins was elected to the Confederate States House of Representatives. However, Dawkins resigned on December 8, 1862 after Governor John Milton appointed him as a state judge.

Candidates 
 James E. Broome, state senator and former governor of Florida
 James Gettis, former state representative
 George E. Hawes, former state senator
 W. M. Ives, editor of the Lake City Columbian
 John Marshall Martin, planter

Campaign 
Unique to this election, none of the five candidates came from West Florida, which had been the state's political powerhouse, showing the waning influence of Pensacola. Martin and Ives were both from North Central Florida; Martin was a planter and Confederate States Army captain from Ocala, while Ives was an influential newspaper editor from Lake City. Broome, the former governor of Florida, was from Tallahassee. Gettis, a former state representative from Tampa, was famous in Florida for his actions during the Battle of Tampa. The only candidate out of the five without a major reputation in the state was Hawes, a former state senator from Orlando, which was still a small frontier town at this time.

General election

Results

See also 
 1861 Confederate States House of Representatives elections
 1863 Confederate States House of Representatives elections

References 

Fla
Fla
1863 Florida elections
Fla
United States House of Representatives 1863 01
Non-partisan elections
Political history of the Confederate States of America